Bela Andreevna Rudenko (Russian: Бэ́ла Андре́евна Руде́нко ; August 18, 1933 – October 13, 2021) was a Ukrainian and Russian opera singer, music teacher, and professor of the Moscow Conservatory. She was awarded the People's Artist of the USSR in 1960 and a Laureate of the USSR State Prize in 1971.

References 

1933 births
2021 deaths
People from Antratsyt
Ukrainian opera singers
Russian opera singers
People's Artists of the USSR
Recipients of the USSR State Prize
Academic staff of Moscow Conservatory